Erwin Nypels (born 1 August 1933 in Bloemendaal, North Holland) is a Dutch former politician.

With a background in the field of public housing and pensions, he worked for years for a settlement of the pensions, and so came with an initiative. Nypels also brought a private member through an arrangement of woningsplitsing established. He was Member of Parliament for D66 he was in 1967 business economist at the PTT and two years chairman of the JOVD. After his political career, he was president of the union for senior staff.

References

1933 births
Living people
People from Bloemendaal
Democrats 66 politicians
Ministers of Housing and Spatial Planning of the Netherlands
Members of the House of Representatives (Netherlands)
University of Amsterdam alumni